Slip ’N Slide is a children's toy invented by Robert Carrier and manufactured by Wham-O. It was first sold in 1961. The main form is a plastic sheet and a method of wetting it; when the surface is wet it becomes very slippery, allowing the user to slide along it. Some versions also include an inflatable pool for the user to slide into, and spray tubes.

History 
The creator was inspired by his son sliding on wet, painted concrete. He used his job as an upholsterer to obtain a long strip of Naugahyde, sewed a tube to pass a hose into, and punctured the tube sporadically to allow water to spurt out. Carrier sold his invention to Wham-O where they replaced Naugahyde with plastic to reduce production costs.

The toy is a long sheet of thin plastic, constructed with a heat-sealed tube running along one side. The tube can be connected to any garden hose and water goes in the tube and out through small holes, spraying onto the sliding surface where it becomes very slippery, enabling users to slide the length of the sheet and also has lubricant molded into the plastic that acts as a propellant. 30 million slides were sold in 2011.

Beyond 2001, Wham-O and makers of similar competitive products later included various enhancements such as an inflatable pool at one end of the sliding surface, spray tubes on both sides and longer paths.

Safety
The Consumer Product Safety Commission (CPSC) and the manufacturer recommend that the use of the toy is only for children to avoid back and neck injuries when it is used by adults and teenagers. People older than children might stop suddenly when diving onto the toy due to the weight or height. Between 1973 and 1991, a 13-year-old and seven adults suffered neck injuries or paralysis while using Slip ’N Slides.

In 1993, CPSC provided a recall notice along with Kransco, which owned Wham-O at the time, to warn users of the dangers; the product was not taken off the market completely but was recommended only for children.

References

External links
 Wham-O, Inc.
 Wham-O, Inc. Archived Press Releases.

1960s toys
Products introduced in 1961
1970s toys
1980s toys
Brands that became generic
Toy recalls
Physical activity and dexterity toys
Wham-O brands